Tuhin Amar Sinha is an Indian author of political thrillers, romance novels and non-fiction works. He has also been active as a newspaper columnist and scriptwriter for television. Since 2016, Sinha has been a spokesperson for the Bharatiya Janata Party (BJP).

Early life and education 
Sinha was born and brought up in Jamshedpur, Jharkhand. His father was an engineer at Tata Motors, while his mother gave up a career as a lawyer to look after Sinha and his younger brother. Sinha completed his schooling at Loyola School and is a commerce graduate from Hindu College, University of Delhi. He also holds a postgraduate diploma in communications management and advertising from the National Institute of Advertising, New Delhi.

Career

Writer 
Sinha worked for a year in a TV ad sales team in his early twenties but did not enjoy the work. He then moved to Mumbai to find work in the entertainment industry. Having tried unsuccessfully to become an actor, he took a scriptwriting course and started writing for TV; finding this too restrictive for his liking, he turned to writing books, debuting with That Thing Called Love in 2007. This was followed by the cricket-themed 22 yards in 2008 and the political thriller Of Love and Politics in 2010. Sinha then proceeded to write a number of further political thrillers and romance novels as well as Daddy, a non-fiction book on parenting from a father's perspective (2015), and two books on Development Politics, one of which was with former BJP president Nitin Gadkari. In 2021 Sinha published the historical novel The Legend of Birsa Munda (2021), a dramatized account of the life of 19th-century religious leader and tribal revolutionary Birsa Munda, co-written with Ankita Verma, followed in 2022 by the non-fiction book The Great Tribal Warriors of Bharat, co-authored with Ambalika.

Politics 
On 31 January 2014, Sinha joined the Bharatiya Janata Party (BJP); in December 2016, he was appointed as the spokesperson for Mumbai region. Sinha subsequently became a national spokesperson of BJP. 

In 2016–2017, Sinha was on the Steering Committee of the national #HaveaSafeJourney (#HASJ) awareness campaign, a road safety initiative by the Ministry of Road Transport and Highways. In 2017, Sinha filed a plea against Rahul Gandhi, then vice-president of the Congress Party, in the Delhi High Court, alleging that Gandhi had violated the Special Protection Group Act by giving his security detail the slip; the court refused to rule on the matter, saying security was a matter for the government.

Reception 
Reviewing for The Hindu, Reshmi Kulkarni found Of Love and Politics to be a "more head-spinning than heady" political thriller with the occasional splashes of romance; notwithstanding some similarities with a recently released film, Sinha's diligent research and linguistic chops were in full display. 

Reviewing The Edge of Desire for the same publication two years later, Kulkarni was less effusive; she found the work to be a one-time-read that suffered from the intense cramming of a multitude of political affairs and more than "giving voice to gender crimes", bemoaned the absence of political leadership. Sayoni Aiyar, reviewing the same book for News18.com, found The Edge of Desire to be "immensely pacey" and making "good use of real-life events" notwithstanding the "inelegant" prose; however, she deplored how Sinha's female lead character, portrayed as an "icon for emancipation", in the end still defined herself entirely by the relationships to the men in her life. 

Reviewing for The Deccan Chronicle, Omkar Sane panned Let The Reason be Love as an epitome of mediocrity and predictability. A review of Sinha's non-fiction book on childcare, Daddy (2015), in The New Indian Express described it as "a very well-written book" for "new-generation fathers."

Bibliography

Fiction 

 That Thing Called Love.
 22 Yards; republished as The Captain.
 Of Love and Politics.
 The Edge of Desire.
 The Edge of Power.
 Let the Reason Be Love.
 When the Chief Fell in Love.
 Mission Shengzhan – India Fights The Dragon (co-authored with Clark Prasad).
 The Legend of Birsa Munda (co-authored with Ankita Verma).

Non-fiction 

 India Aspires: Redefining Politics of Development (co-authored with former BJP president Nitin Gadkari).
 Daddy.
 India Inspires: Redefining the Politics of Deliverance.
 The Great Tribal Warriors of Bharat (co-authored with Ambalika).

References

External links 
 
 Sinha's Write India profile on the Times of India website
 Sinha speaking on the role of corporates in road safety at a 2018 FICCI event
 Sinha speaking on the way ahead for Kashmir at the Orange City Literature Festival

Living people
Indian male novelists
Novelists from Jharkhand
Indian television writers
People from Jamshedpur
Male television writers
Year of birth missing (living people)
Bharatiya Janata Party politicians from Jharkhand